Jukjeon-dong may refer to:

 Jukjeon-dong, Daegu, a dong in Dalseo District, Daegu city, South Korea
 Jukjeon-dong, Yongin, a dong in Suji-gu, Yongin city, Gyeonggi Province, South Korea
 Jukjeon-dong, Sangju, a dong in Sangju city, North Gyeongsang Province, South Korea